The 2011 Champions League Twenty20 was the third edition of the Champions League Twenty20, an international Twenty20 cricket tournament. It was held in India from 19 September to 9 October 2011. It was the first edition after Nokia replaced Bharti Airtel as the tournament's title sponsor. The defending champions were the Chennai Super Kings.

The Mumbai Indians emerged the winners of the tournament, defeating the Royal Challengers Bangalore in the final. David Warner from the New South Wales Blues won the Golden Bat Award, while Ravi Rampaul was awarded the Golden Wicket Award and Lasith Malinga was declared the Player of the Tournament.

Format
The tournament was the first edition to feature a qualifying stage, which consists of six teams competing for three spots in the main tournament. The main tournament had the same format as the previous year. It consists of 23 matches, and is divided into a group stage and a knockout stage. If a match ends in a tie, a Super Over will be played to determine the winner.

The group stage has the teams divided into two equal groups, with each playing a round-robin tournament. The top two teams of each group advance to the knockout stage. The knockout stage consists of two semi-finals, with the top team of one group facing the second from the other. The winners of the semi-finals play the grand final to determine the winners of the competition.

Points awarded in the group stage:

Prize money
Same as the previous tournaments, the total prize money for the competition is US$6 million. In addition to the prize money, each team in the main tournament receives a participation fee of $500,000. The prize money will be distributed as follows:

$200,000 – Each team eliminated in the group stage
$500,000 – Each semi-finalist
$1.3 million – Runners-up
$2.5 million – Winners

Teams
The following tournaments were the qualifying tournaments:

The following teams qualified for the competition:

Squads

Eight players were originally nominated for two squads and the players were allowed to decide which team they would play for in the tournament. All players chose to play for their Indian Premier League team. The tournament rules state each team may only field four overseas players but an exception was made for the Mumbai Indians. They were allowed to field five overseas players as many of their Indian players were unable to play due to injury. Without the exception they would have been unable to construct a team of eleven.

Venues
The tournament was hosted at three venues across India with the qualifying stage to be held at Rajiv Gandhi International Cricket Stadium. Both the Chennai Super Kings and Royal Challengers Bangalore played some of their group stage matches at their home grounds.

The Chennai Super Kings would play their semi-final in Chennai if they qualify. Similarly, unless they play against the Chennai Super Kings, the Royal Challengers Bangalore would play their semi-final in Bengaluru if they qualify. Chennai will host the final.

Qualifying stage

Format
A six-team qualifying stage was held in Hyderabad from 19 to 21 September. The teams were divided into two groups of three, with each playing a round-robin tournament. The top teams in each group and the best performing team from the remaining teams qualified from this tournament. The following teams participated in the qualifying stage:

Fixtures
All match times in Indian Standard Time (UTC+5:30).

Pool A

Pool B

Fixtures
All match times in Indian Standard Time (UTC+5:30).

Group stage

Group A

Group B

Knockout stage
The top two teams from each group qualify for the semi-finals.

Semi-finals

Final

Final standings

Statistics

Most runs

Most wickets

References

External links
CricInfo Champions League Twenty20 minisite

2011
Champions League Twenty20
Champions League Twenty20
Champions League Twenty20